Breuna is a small municipality in the district of Kassel, in Hesse, Germany. It is situated 24 kilometers northwest of the town of Kassel. Its oldest part is the village of Rhöda, first mentioned in the early ninth century.

Twin towns — sister cities
Breuna is twinned with:

  Gehlberg, Germany
  Predappio, Italy

References

Kassel (district)